The Pratt & Whitney GG4 and FT4 are related aero-derivative gas turbine engines developed from the Pratt & Whitney J75/JT4 turbojet line.

See also

References

External links

Aero-derivative engines
Gas turbines
Marine engines